AJ Chandler also known as Adam "AJ" Chandler III is a fictional character from the American serial drama, All My Children. From April 29 to September 2, 2013, the role has been portrayed by Eric Nelsen.

Casting
The role of AJ Chandler was originated by child actors Aidan and Liam O'Donnell from 2004 to 2005, also appearing on sister soap One Life to Live during the baby switch storyline involving both soaps. From 2005 to 2008, the role was portrayed by Jarred Sturman and Shane Passaro and by Declan and Rory McTigue from 2008 to 2010 and by Tate Berney from 2010 until the show's series finale on September 23, 2011.

Storylines

2004–2011
In 2004, a MEDEVAC helicopter carrying Bianca Montgomery and Babe Carey—and piloted by Babe's ex-husband Paul Cramer—crashes in a storm. Both women are pregnant and give birth during the crisis on March 23, 2004. Paul's half-sister Kelly from nearby Llanview has just miscarried her own baby; Paul gives Babe's son to Kelly and gives Bianca's daughter to Babe, telling Bianca that her baby died. Unaware of the infant's origins, Kelly brings Babe and JR's son back to Llanview, passing him off as her child with her husband Kevin Buchanan.

Kevin and Kelly name the baby Asa "Ace" Buchanan II, after Kevin's grandfather Asa Buchanan. Over the next year, their marriage crumbles and Kevin tries to secure custody, but fails. Meanwhile, Kelly discovers that Paul had stolen Ace from his mother; Paul, desperate for cash, blackmails Kelly by threatening to reveal the secret to Kevin and Llanview. Armed with the truth, Kelly realizes they must return the child to his parents; though broken hearted, they do.

Babe and JR wage their own custody battle over their son, now named Adam Chandler III. At one point Babe goes on the run with JR's former stepbrother Jamie Martin, giving her son the alias James Carey. He is often referred to as "Little Adam" or "Little A" by his parents, and soon by everyone else.

In mid-2008, JR and Babe reunite and take their time in their new relationship. Babe soon dies due to injuries caused by a tornado. Little Adam is now being raised by his father after his mother's death. She was killed on October 23, 2008 to save him from being killed.

After his mother's death, Krystal divorced Tad, got back together with David and become married in 2009. David seeks custody of Little Adam by making JR seem like an unfit father, but JR fights him on this. Due to the judge at the custody hearing not being able to decide which of the two men Little Adam would be better off with, Jesse and Angie get temporary custody of him. JR gets Little Adam back after Krystal lies on the stand to protect herself in order to keep Adam from revealing a secret about her.

JR marries his aunt Marissa Tasker on October 21, 2009, while JR is dealing with lymphoma. Marissa legally adopts him on March 3, 2010, and he now goes by the name "AJ".

Even though he doesn't know it, his father JR is having an affair with his ex-step-grandmother Annie Chandler and his parents are having problems in their relationship because of JR's affair with Annie.

JR goes back to his alcoholism in the summer of 2011, after Marissa reveals that she reciprocates the feelings of and is now dating Bianca Montgomery (the lesbian mother of AJ's good friends Miranda and Gabby). A frightened AJ spurns his father and turns to Marissa, and his de facto step-grandfather Tad Martin for guidance and comfort.

2013
On April 29, 2013, AJ reappeared on the online reboot of All My Children. He is shown to be the best friend of Bianca's daughter, Miranda Montgomery and both have been aged to teenagers due to the time jump. AJ is frequently seen consoling or advising Miranda.

References

Television characters introduced in 2004
All My Children characters
One Life to Live characters
Male characters in television
Crossover characters in television